Aleksandr Poznyak (born 23 July 1994) is a Belarusian professional football player who plays as a centre-back for Russian club Kuban Krasnodar on loan from Dinamo Minsk.

International career
Poznyak earned his first cap for the national team of his country on 26 February 2020, playing the full 90 minutes in the 1–0 away win over Bulgaria in a friendly match.

References

External links

Profile at teams.by

1994 births
Living people
People from Lida
Sportspeople from Grodno Region
Belarusian footballers
Association football defenders
Belarus international footballers
FC Neman Grodno players
FC Lida players
FC Shakhtyor Soligorsk players
FC Gorodeya players
FC Dynamo Brest players
FK Rabotnički players
FC Minsk players
FC Shakhter Karagandy players
FC Dinamo Minsk players
FC Urozhay Krasnodar players
Belarusian Premier League players
Belarusian First League players
Macedonian First Football League players
Kazakhstan Premier League players
Belarusian expatriate footballers
Expatriate footballers in North Macedonia
Expatriate footballers in Kazakhstan
Belarusian expatriate sportspeople in Kazakhstan
Expatriate footballers in Russia
Belarusian expatriate sportspeople in Russia